The AE-COPSD Sport badge (French, Brevet Sportif des Polices Européennes (B.S.P.E.); English, "European Police Sports Badge") is a decoration awarded by the European association of the Bodies and Public Organisms of Security and of Defense (French, Association Européenne des Membres de Corps et Organismes Publics de Sécurité et de Défense (AE-COPSD)). To be awarded the sports badge, participants must meet the standards in their choice of event within each of the seven listed categories. The badge is awarded based upon performance in ether Bronze, Silver, and Gold. The participant may compete for the badge on an annual basis. AE-COPSD personnel must grade and certify each event. The three grades are awarded based on the number of points earned.

The events are: 
high jump
long jump
75 meter run
300 meter run or 100 meter swim for women
400 meter run or 100 meter swim run for men
1000 meter run
shot put or stone put
200 meter swim
2000 meter run or 1000 meter swim for women
3000 meter run or 1000 meter swim for men.

See also
AE-COPSD Paratroopers Wings
World Police and Fire Games
European Police Achievement Badge

Sources
Brevet Sportif des Polices Européennes. Association Européenne des Membres de Corps et Organismes Publics de Sécurité et de Défense (AE-COPSD) website (in French)

External links
Brevet Sportif des Polices Européennes. Association Européenne des Membres de Corps et Organismes Publics de Sécurité et de Défense (AE-COPSD) website (in French)

European sports trophies and awards
Law enforcement in Europe